John Doukas was a senior Byzantine military commander and diplomat under Manuel I Komnenos, serving in Italy, Hungary, Asia Minor, and the Holy Land. He rose to the rank of sebastos and the office of megas hetaireiarches. Several of his seals bearing these titles are extant.

Demetrios Polemis erroneously identified him with his contemporary, the Eparch of the City John Kamateros, as "John Doukas Kamateros". This has been corrected by other scholars since. Patricia Karlin-Hayter notably decomposed Polemis' composite figure into six or seven different people, of which John Doukas was assigned the bulk of the military and diplomatic career of Polemis' figure. 

The first activity which can be more or less securely attributed to John Doukas is an embassy to the Holy Roman Emperor Frederick I Barbarossa in 1155/6, followed by his stay in Italy. He then commanded an expedition in Dalmatia in 1164, and against the Hungarians in 1166. He is first attested as megas hetaireiarches in 1170, when he attended the synod at Constantinople that condemned John Eirenikos. In 1177, he led an embassy to Baldwin IV of Jerusalem. In 1179, he paid a visit to Thessalonica and was the object of an oration by the scholar and archbishop Eustathius of Thessalonica, who praises his interest in theology. He is known to have corresponded with Michael Glykas concerning theological matters. Eustathius further mentions that he fought unspecified campaigns in Asia Minor. Another scholar, the philosopher Constantine of Nicaea, wrote a consolatio on the death of John's wife, praising her interest in "real philosophy" (ascetic virtue).

John supported the accession of Alexios II Komnenos in 1180. He may be the John Doukas that Niketas Choniates has him defending Nicaea unsuccessfully against Andronikos Komnenos in 1182. This identification is uncertain, since Choniates does not give him a title. If he still was megas hetaireiarches, he was replaced by Andronikos.

References

Sources
 
 
 
 
 

12th-century births
12th-century deaths
12th-century diplomats
12th-century Byzantine people
Byzantine diplomats
Generals of Manuel I Komnenos
Year of death unknown
Year of birth unknown
Christians of the Third Crusade
Sebastoi
Byzantine Empire–Holy Roman Empire relations
Megaloi hetaireiarchai